The Tijuca National Park is an urban national park in the mountains of the city of Rio de Janeiro, Brazil. The park is part of the Atlantic Forest Biosphere Preserve, and is administered by the Chico Mendes Institute for Biodiversity Conservation (ICMBio).

History 
The contemporary Tijuca National Park and its surrounding forests are largely the result of reforestation. In the 1700s, forests in the future park around Rio de Janeiro were cleared for fuel, coffee growing and livestock. The small streams in the former forest were a significant source of the city's water supply, and with variable rainfall the city began to experience water shortages and flash floods.

Emperor Pedro II of Brazil established federal control over the area in 1861, and efforts began to restore the former forest on the bare slopes and abandoned fields. The re-planting of trees was carried out by 6 enslaved persons. Their names were Eleutério, Constantino, Manuel, Mateus, Leopoldo, and Maria. These people were enslaved by the Portuguese government and under the supervision of the Tijuca Forest manager Major Manuel Gomes Archer. They planted over 100,000 trees from 1861 to 1887. Around this time, a cog railway was built to carry passengers to the top of Corcovado, and between 1922 and 1931 the famous statue Christ the Redeemer was built.

In 1961, Tijuca Forest was declared a national park and in 2011, the Carioca Mosaic was established, including the park. In 2012, UNESCO designated the landscapes around Rio de Janeiro, including the park, as a world heritage site.

Geography

The park shares its name with the bairros (neighborhoods) of Tijuca and Barra da Tijuca nearby. The word Tijuca comes from the Tupi language and means marsh, a reference to the Tijuca Lagoon in the contemporary Barra da Tijuca.

It is located in a mountainous region which encompasses the Tijuca Massif. Among its impressive peaks are the Pedra da Gávea,Corcovado and Pico da Tijuca. The forest and mountains form a natural boundary that separates the West Zone of Rio from the rest of the city, as well as dividing the North and South Zones.

One favela exists in the Tijuca Forest, called Mata Machado. Its inhabitants are mainly the descendants of those who migrated to the region in the 1930s to take part in the replanting effort. Though conditions have improved recently under the Favela-Bairro Project, it still contributes to environmental degradation in the forest.

Ecology

The Forest is home to hundreds of species of plants and wildlife, many threatened by extinction, and found only in the Atlantic Forest biome. The vegetation is so dense that scientists have estimated that ambient temperatures in surrounding areas have been lowered by up to 9 °C. The forest also contains some 30 waterfalls.

Due to the reforestation efforts of the late 19th century, about half of the area of a park is a mix of about 30 native tree species and ten introduced species. It is currently threatened by frequent, accidental fires set by humans, a problem compounded by colonization by more flammable grasses displacing native vegetation.

Tourism

Given its proximity to the city, the park receives heavy use: in 2016, the park received 3,305,010 visitors. The park contains a number of attractions, most famously the colossal sculpture of Christ the Redeemer. Other attractions include the Cascatinha Waterfall; the Mayrink Chapel, with murals painted by Cândido Portinari; the pagoda-style gazebo at Vista Chinesa; and a giant granite table called the Mesa do Imperador ("Emperor's Table"). 

There are numerous hiking trails. Common destinations are: Diamantina's waterfall, Parrot's Beak (Bico do Papagaio), Tijuca's Peak (Pico da Tijuca), Cave Circuit (Circuito das Grutas), Archer's Hill (Morro do Archer), Anhanguera's Hill (Morro da Anhanguera), the Excelsior Lookout (Mirante do Excelsior) and the Bat's Cave (Caverna dos Morcegos).

See also
List of mammals of Tijuca National Park

Notes

Sources

External links
 Official site of Tijuca National Park at ICMBio (in Portuguese)
Tijuca National Park, Rio de Janeiro - by the Royal Geographical Society's Hidden Journeys project
 Virtual Pic-Tour through the "jungle" @ The Rio de Janeiro Photo Guide

1961 establishments in Brazil
Forests of Brazil
Parks in Rio de Janeiro (city)
Protected areas established in 1961
Protected areas of Rio de Janeiro (state)
Protected areas of the Atlantic Forest